Iris Bahr is an American actress, comedian, director, writer,  author, producer and host of the X-RAE podcast. She is best known for her recurring role as Rachel Heinemann on Curb Your Enthusiasm, Perla on "Hacks", her solo show DAI (enough), and her TV series Svetlana, which she wrote, directed, starred in and produced with Mark Cuban. She is the author of three published books, Dork Whore, Machu my Picchu and Book of Leon which she co-wrote with J. B. Smoove.

Early life
Bahr was born in the Bronx, New York, but immigrated to Israel with her mother at age 13, after her parents divorced. During her two years service in the Israel Defense Forces's military intelligence, she attained the rank of sergeant. As a young woman, she traveled throughout Southeast Asia and South America. She is a magna cum laude graduate of  Brown University, where she studied neuropsychology and religious studies.  Bahr did neuroscience and cancer research at Stanford University and Tel Aviv University.

Career
Bahr guest starred on a variety of television shows, including guest appearances on "Hacks", "The Conners", Good Girls, Losing Alice, 9-1-1, Strong Medicine, The Drew Carey Show, Friends, and The King of Queens, as well as recurring character Rachel Heinemann on Curb Your Enthusiasm.

In 2006, Bahr appeared in her first movie lead role in playing Amy Butlin in Larry the Cable Guy: Health Inspector alongside Larry the Cable Guy. In May 2006 she had a supporting role as Leonard Hofstadter's co worker in the unaired pilot of The Big Bang Theory.

In November 2006, she opened her one woman show Dai (Enough) at the Culture Project in New York City. In the show, she plays ten different characters in a Tel Aviv cafe moments before a suicide bomber enters. Bahr received the 2008 Lucille Lortel Award for Best Solo Performance for Dai, which also earned 2 Drama Desk Award nominations for Best Solo show and Best Sound Design. She also received a UK Stage Award Nomination for Outstanding Solo Performance. Bahr was invited to perform Dai at the United Nations for over 100 ambassadors and delegates.
She premiered her third solo show, I Lost You There at the Cherry Lane Theatre in NYC in 2017. 
Her fourth solo show, a sequel to DAI, entitled DAI 2.0, was slated to open in NYC in April 2020 but was canceled due to Covid. She reimagined the show for streaming and premiered the show to a live audience online in December 2020. 
Her fifth solo show, "Stroke Of" is slated to premiere in NYC in August 2022.

In 2007, Bahr was a part of the film Poughkeepsie Tapes. In this she plays an interviewed news broadcaster.

She moved to Los Angeles after a city truck injured her when it collided with her bicycle on Great Jones Street in New York.

Bahr's memoir entitled Dork Whore was published in 2007, and was translated into German, Italian and Portuguese. It became a bestseller in Germany. The sequel, Macchu My Picchu chronicles her travels through South America. She co-wrote Book of Leon, which came out in 2018, with comic JB Smoove.

Bahr was a series regular on the Israeli TV series Irreversible.

Bahr did voice acting work for the Star Trek computer games Star Trek: Voyager – Elite Force, Star Trek: Elite Force II and Star Trek: Away Team, released in 2000, 2003 and 2001 respectively. She followed this up with an appearance on the last episode of Star Trek: Voyager, "Endgame" in 2001. She also voiced the character of Madeline Taylor in Soldier of Fortune II: Double Helix (2002).

Bahr also had a weekly commentary on NPR's Los Angeles affiliate KCRW entitled "Social Studies", featuring one of her characters - Svetlana, Russian lady of the night and proprietor of the "St. Petersburg House of Discreet Pleasure." Svetlana was also a recurring guest on The Marc Maron Show, and has done regular pieces for Kurt Andersen's show on WNYC's Studio 360.
She is the host of the X-RAE podcast as her alter ego Rae Lynn Caspar White, a "Southern Intellectual, professional baby surrogate and sexpert". Her guests have included Lawrence O'Donnell, Doug Liman, author Roddy Doyle, Andie MacDowell, neuroscientists, academics and various comedians and artists.

Filmography

Film

Television

Video games

Books

References

External links
Iris Bahr's official website
Iris Bahr's official podcast website

New York Times feature article on Iris Bahr
Svetlana  website for TV series

American television actresses
Jewish American actresses
Jewish women writers
Living people
People from the Bronx
Brown University alumni
Israeli soldiers
American women writers
21st-century American actresses
Year of birth missing (living people)
American people of Israeli descent
Israeli people of American-Jewish descent
21st-century American Jews